The honey possum or noolbenger (Tarsipes rostratus), is a tiny species of marsupial that feeds on the nectar and pollen of a diverse range of flowering plants. Found in southwest Australia, it is an important pollinator for such plants as Banksia attenuata, Banksia coccinea and Adenanthos cuneatus.

Taxonomy 
The first description of the diprotodont species was published by Paul Gervais and Jules Verreaux on 3 March 1842, referring to a specimen collected by Verreaux. The lectotype nominated for this species, held in the collection at National Museum of Natural History, France, was collected the Swan River Colony. A description of a second species Tarsipes spenserae, published five days later by John Edward Gray and current until the 1970s, was thought to have been published earlier by T. S. Palmer in 1904 and displaced the usage of T. rostratus. A review by Mahoney in 1984 again reduced T. spenserae to a synonym for the species, as was the emendation to its spelling as spencerae cited by William Ride (1970) and others.
Gray's specimen was provided by George Grey to the British Museum of Natural History, the skin of a male also collected at King George Sound.
The author was aware of the description prepared by Gervais, who after examining his specimen suggested it represented a second species.

The population is the only known species in the genus Tarsipes, and assigned to a monotypic diprotodont family Tarsipedidae. The name of the genus means "tarsier-foot", given for a resemblance to tarsier's simian-like feet and toes noted by the earliest descriptions.

The poorly resolved phylogeny of ancestral marsupial relationships has presented this taxon, unique in many characteristics, in an arrangement of other higher classifications, including the separation as a superfamily Tarsipedoidea, later abandoned in favour grouping of South American and Australian marsupials as a monophyletic clade that ignores the modern geographic remoteness of these continent's fauna.

The relationships of the monotypic family within the Diprotodontia order as a petauroid alliance may be summarised as,
Superfamily Petauroidea
 Family Pseudocheiridae ringtail possums
 Family Petauridae gliders and trioks
 Family Tarsipedidae
 Genus Tarsipes
 Tarsipes rostratus
 Family Acrobatidae gliders

The closest relationship to other taxa was theorised to be Dromiciops gliroides, another smaller marsupial that occurs in South America and is known as the extant member of a genus that is represented in the Gondwanan fossil record. This was supported by phylogenetic analysis, but this is no longer believed to be true.

At Grey's suggestion, the maiden name of his wife Eliza Lucy Spencer was assigned to the epithet. Eliza or Elizabeth was the daughter of the government resident at King George Sound, Richard Spencer, prompting the unacceptable correction by Ride in 1970.

The common names include those cited or coined by Gilbert, Gould and Ellis Troughton, honey and long-snouted phalanger, tait and noolbenger in the local languages, or the descriptive brown barred mouse. An ethnographic survey of Noongar words recorded for the species found three names were in use, and proposed that these be regularised for spelling and pronunciation as ngoolboongoor (ngool'bong'oor), djebin (dje'bin) and dat. The term honey mouse was recorded by Troughton in 1922 as commonly used in the districts around King George Sound.

Description
A tiny marsupial that climbs woody plants to feed on the pollen and nectar, the honey, of banksia and eucalypts. They resemble a small mouse or the arboreal possums of Australia, and are readily distinguished by the exceptionally long muzzle and three brown stripes from the head to the rump.
The pelage is a cream colour below that merges to rufous at the flanks, the overall coloration of the upperparts is a mix of brown and grey hairs. A dark brown central stripe extends from the rump to a mid-point between the ears, this is a more distinct stripe than the two paler adjacent stripes. The length of the tail is from 70 to 100 millimetres, exceeding the combined body and head length of 65 to 85 mm, and has a prehensile ability that assists in climbing. The recorded weight range for the species is 5 to 10 grams.

The number of teeth are fewer and most much smaller than is typical for marsupials, with the molars reduced to tiny cones. The dental formula of I2/1 C1/0 P1/0 M3/3 totals no more than 22 teeth.
The morphology of the elongated snout's jaws and dentition presents a number of unique characteristics suited to the specialisation as a palynivore and nectivore.
Tarsipes tongue is extensible and the end covered in brush-like papillae, with the redundant action of the modified or reduced teeth being replaced by the interaction of the tongue, keel-like lower incisors and a fine combing surface at the palate.

The testes are very large in size, noted as proportionally the greatest for a mammal at 4.6 percent of the body weight. The sperm also has an exceptional length; its tail (flagellum) measurement of 360 micrometres also cited as the longest known.
Specialised characters of T. rostratus include visual acuity for detecting the bright yellow inflorescence of Banksia attenuata.

They have a typical lifespan between one and two years.

They have trichromat vision, similar to some other marsupials as well as primates but unlike most mammals which have dichromat vision.

Behaviour
The honey possum is mainly nocturnal, but will come out to feed during daylight in cooler weather. Generally, though, it spends the days asleep in a shelter of convenience: a rock cranny, a tree cavity, the hollow inside of a grass tree, or an abandoned bird nest. When food is scarce, or in cold weather, it becomes torpid to conserve energy. In comparison to other marsupials of a similar size, T. rostratus has a high body temperature and metabolic rate that is termed euthermic.  Lacking fat reserves, but able to reduce their body temperature, exposure to cooler temperatures or lack of food induces one of two states of torpor. One response is a shallow and brief period, similar to torpid dasyurids, where the body temperature is above 10–15 degrees Celsius, and another deeper state like the burramyids that lasts for multiple days and reduces their temperature to less than 10 °C.

The species is able to climb with the assistance of the prehensile tail and an opposable first toe at the long hindfoot that is able to grip like a monkey's paw. The bristle-like papillae at the upper surface of the tongue increase in length toward the tip, and this is used to gather the pollen and nectar by rapidly wiping it into the inflorescence.
Both its front and back feet are adept at grasping, enabling it to climb trees with ease, as well as traverse the undergrowth at speed. The honey possum can also use its prehensile tail (which is longer than its head and body combined) to grip, much like another arm.
Radio-tracking has shown that males particularly are quite mobile, moving distances of up to 0.5 km in a night and use areas averaging 0.8 hectares. Males seem to venture out in a larger range, and some evidence indicates greater distances covered; evidence of pollen found on an individual in a study area was from a banksia not found within three kilometres of the collection site. 
The plant species that provide nectar and pollen to T. rostratus are primarily genera of Proteaceae, Banksia and Adenanthos, and Myrtaceae, eucalypts and Agonis, and those of Epacridaceae, shrubby heath plants, although it is also known to visit the inflorescence of Anigozanthos, the kangaroo paws, and the tall spikes of Xanthorrhoea, the grass-trees.
Study of the amount of nectar and pollen has concluded that a nine gram individual requires around seven millilitres of nectar and one gram of pollen each day to maintain an energetic balance. This amount of pollen provides sufficient nitrogen for the species high activity metabolism, and the additional nitrogen requirements of females during lactation is available in the pollen of Banksia species.
The ingestion of excess water when feeding at wet flowers, a frequent circumstance in the high rainfall regions of its range, is able to be eliminated by kidneys that can process up to two times the animals body weight in water.
Pollen grains are digested over the course of six hours, extracting almost all the nutrients they contain.

Reproduction 
Breeding depends on the availability of nectar and can occur at any time of the year. Females are promiscuous, mating with a large number of males and may simultaneously carry embryos from different progenitors. Competition has led to the males having very large testicles relative to their body weight, at a relative mass of 4.2% it is amongst the largest known for a mammal. Their sperm is the largest in the mammal world, measuring 365 micrometres.

The development of blastocysts corresponds to day length, induced by a shorter photoperiod, but other reproductive processes are prompted by other factor, probably food availability. Gestation lasts for 28 days, with two to four young being produced. At birth, they are the smallest of any mammal, weighing 0.005 g. Nurturing and development within the pouch lasts for about 60 days, after which they emerge covered in fur and with open eyes, weighing some 2.5 g. As soon as they emerge, they are often left in a sheltered area (such as a hollow in a tree) while the mother searches for food for herself, but within days, they learn to grab hold of the mother's back and travel with her. However, their weight soon becomes too much, and they stop nursing at around 11 weeks, and start to make their own homes shortly thereafter. As is common in marsupials, a second litter is often born when the pouch is vacated by the first, fertilised embryos being stopped from developing.

Most of the time, honey possums stick to separate territories of about one hectare (2.5 acres), outside of the breeding season. They live in small groups of no more than 10, which results in them engaging in combat with one another only rarely. During the breeding season, females move into smaller areas with their young, which they will defend fiercely, especially from any males.

Distribution
Although restricted to a fairly small range in the southwest of Western Australia, it is locally common and does not seem to be threatened with extinction so long as its habitat of heath, shrubland, and woodland remains intact and diverse.
Records of locations held at the Western Australian Museum indicate they are more common in regions of high Proteaceae diversity, areas such as banksia woodlands where species can be found flowering at all times of the year.

Ecology 
Tarsipe rostratus is a keystone species in the ecology of the coastal sands of Southwest Australia, complex assemblages of plants known as kwongan, and are likely to be the primary pollinator of woody shrubs such as banksia and Adenanthos. Their feeding activity involves visits to many individual plants and the head carries a small pollen load that can convey more effectively than the birds that visit the same flowers. The favoured species Banksia attenuata appears to be obliged to this animal as a pollination vector, and both species have evolved to suit their mutualistic interactions.

The effect of fire frequency on the population was evaluated in a study over a twenty three-year period, giving indications of resilience of the species to the first fire in the area and a subsequent burn six years later. The effect of increased frequency and intensity of fire, due to global warming and prescribed burns can adversely affect the suitability of the local habitat.
The species is susceptible to the impact of Phytophthora cinnamomi, a soil borne fungal-like species that is associated with forest dieback in the eucalypt forests and banksia woodlands of the region. The flowers of the nine plant species most favoured by T. rostratus provide food throughout the year, and five of these are vulnerable to the withering condition caused by P. cinnamomi pathogen.

It is the only entirely nectarivorous mammal which is not a bat; it has a long, pointed snout and a long, protrusile tongue with a brush tip that gathers pollen and nectar, like a honeyeater or a hummingbird. Floral diversity is particularly important for the honey possum, as it cannot survive without a year-round supply of nectar and, unlike nectarivorous birds, it cannot easily travel long distances in search of fresh supplies.

Natural history 
An animal well known to the Noongar people of southwest, and incorporated into their culture, the name ngoolboongoor from the indigenous language has been proposed for modern usage as a common name, written as noolbenger. Honey possums continue to be an iconic animal to the people of the region, and was selected by Amok Island to feature in a large public art project on silos in the wheatbelt. The first report of the species was compiled by John Gilbert, the careful and thorough field collector commissioned by Gould to travel to the new colony at the Swan River on the west coast of Australia. Gilbert obtained access to Noongar informants that provided him with the names and details of the animals habits and, with some difficulty, four specimens for scientific examination. Both he and Gould recognised the unique characters of the unknown species.

The next major field study was undertaken by the mammalogist Ellis Troughton at the suggestion of H. L. White, who provided an introduction to the professional collector F. Lawson Whitlock. Troughton's visit to King George Sound was guided by Whitlock to the source of a specimen he had sent to White, a man in the same region named David Morgan who accommodated the biologist while he searched extensively and unsuccessfully for further specimens. Troughton was eventually provided with a series of a dozen specimens when he was preparing to leave Albany port, a collection assembled over many years by the cats of Hugh Leishman at Nannarup.
The collection of the Australian Museum was increased when Morgan continued to forward specimens to Troughton, firstly with two pregnant females that were also killed by a cat, and then with a report of living animals he was able to maintain in captivity for five to six weeks. Morgan reported that his cat would bring a mangled specimen on a daily basis for a period of time, and observed it seeking them in a flowering shrub at dusk, but thought their local appearance was seasonally related and became absent outside the breeding season.

Closer study of the reproductive processes was allowed by the capture, extended observation and dissection of the species in University programs, the first success in captivity beginning in 1974. Examination of the reproductive strategies has allowed comparison to the other modern marsupial families, in particular the evolution of embryonic diapause.
The population structure and feeding habits of T. rostratrus was poorly understood until a biological study at the Fitzgerald River National Park was completed in 1984.

A diet consisting entirely of nectar is unusual for a terrestrial vertebrate species, usually birds and flying mammals, and specialisation to the niche provided by the success of plant families Proteaceae and Myrtaceae began around forty million years ago.

References

Mammals of Western Australia
Possums
Mammals described in 1842
Taxa named by Paul Gervais
Diprotodonts
Endemic fauna of Southwest Australia